Esther Dweck (born 23 May 1977) is a Brazilian economist, professor and writer. She is currently a professor at the Institute of Economics of the Federal University of Rio de Janeiro. In December 2022, she was nominated the Minister of Management by the president Luiz Inácio Lula da Silva.

Notes

See also 

 Maria da Conceição Tavares
 Paulo Guedes
 Second presidency of Lula da Silva

References

External links 

 

|-

Living people
1977 births
Brazilian women economists
Federal University of Rio de Janeiro alumni
Academic staff of the Federal University of Rio de Janeiro
Academic staff of Fluminense Federal University
Government ministers of Brazil
Women government ministers of Brazil